White mercenaries in the Congo are caucasians from Africa (afrikaners and other descendants of European colonizers) and Europe who participated in various military conflicts on the territory of the Republic of the Congo (Leopoldville), Zaire and the Democratic Republic of the Congo. Since 1960, south africans, rhodesians, British, Irish, germans, belgians, French, spaniards, italians, serbs, belarusians, russians, ukrainians, georgians and some others have fought in the Congolese wars.

Background
After the World Wars, the tradition of mercenary work was revived. This was helped by the decolonization of Africa. In the young african republics, the old colonial system was destroyed, armies were in the process of being created, internal conflicts began. The governments of the countries were looking for professional military personnel with combat experience.

Meaning 
In the 60s, the mercenaries were able to turn the tide of the war in favor of the government. The experience of using mercenaries in the Congo was used during the Angolan Civil War.

It was in the Congo that the careers of many famous mercenaries of the 20th century began. Modern ideas and stereotypes about mercenaries have been formed here.

History

1960s 
The Congo Crisis (1960–1965) was a period of turmoil in the First Republic of the Congo that began with national independence from Belgium and ended with the seizing of power by Joseph Mobutu. During the crisis, mercenaries were employed by various factions, and also at times helped the United Nations and other peace keepers.

In 1960 and 1961, Mike Hoare worked as a mercenary commanding an English-speaking unit called "4 Commando" supporting a faction in Katanga, a province trying to break away from the newly independent Congo under the leadership of Moïse Tshombe. Hoare chronicled his exploits in his book the Road to Kalamata.

In 1964 Tshombe (then Prime Minister of Congo) hired Major Hoare to lead a military unit called "5 Commando" made up of about 300 men, most of whom were from South Africa. The unit's mission was to fight a rebel group called Simbas, who already had captured almost two-thirds of the country.

In Operation Dragon Rouge, "5 Commando" worked in close cooperation with Belgian paratroopers, Cuban exile pilots, and CIA hired mercenaries. The objective of Operation Dragon Rouge was to capture Stanleyville and save several hundred civilians (mostly Europeans and missionaries) who were hostages of the Simba rebels. The operation saved many lives; however, the Operation damaged the reputation of Moïse Tshombe as it saw the return of white mercenaries to the Congo soon after independence and was a factor in Tshombe's loss of support from president of Congo Joseph Kasa-Vubu who dismissed him from his position

At the same time Bob Denard commanded the French-speaking "6 Commando", "Black Jack" Schramme commanded "10 Commando" and William "Rip" Robertson commanded a company of anti-Castro Cuban exiles.

Later, in 1966 and 1967, some former Tshombe mercenaries and Katangese gendarmes staged the Mercenaries' Mutinies.

1990s 
In November—December 1996, with the direct participation of the French special services, the White Legion unit was formed. It was headed by Belgian Christian Tavernier. The formation joined the army of the Mobutu Sese Seko regime.

21st century
Since 2000, hired pilots from the former USSR have piloted congolese Su-25s. Two planes with Ukrainian Mokratov (June 2007) and Belarusian Likhotkin (December 2006) were lost.

In January 2017, tutsi rebels shot down two Mi-24 helicopters with georgian and belarusian crews.

References

Literature  
 
 Коновалов, Иван Петрович. Солдаты удачи и воины корпораций : История современного наёмничества. — Пушкино : Центр стратегической конъюнктуры, 2015. — 216 с. — ББК 68:8 К64. — УДК 623(G). — ISBN 978-5-9906069-7-5.

Mercenaries
Congo Crisis
First Congo War
Second Congo War
Kivu conflict